The Financial Conduct Authority v Arch Insurance (UK) Ltd & others [2021] UKSC 1 is a United Kingdom Supreme Court case determining whether commercial insurance policies for business interruption cover claims due to the COVID-19 pandemic and consequent lockdowns. The case has implications on disputed business interruption claims worth at least £1.2 billion and affecting 370,000 businesses, primarily in the hospitality and entertainment sectors. On 15 January 2021, the Supreme Court found in favour of the claimants.

Background 

To prevent the spread of COVID-19, the UK government locked down the country in March 2020, causing businesses to temporarily close, particularly in the hospitality and entertainment sectors. This lockdown resulted in heavy financial losses to businesses. Thousands of businesses submitted claims under insurance policies that covered interruption of business, but insurers denied paying out, saying their policies did not cover the pandemic.

Around 400 companies had submitted complaints to the Financial Ombudsman, claiming that they had been wrongfully denied payouts. Figures from the Association of British Insurers during the first lockdown in March 2020 estimated that the total cost of business interruption claims to be £900 million. Insurance cover varies between providers, with different policy wordings; some insurers stated that they don't cover diseases not explicitly named in the policy, other insurers stated that only local outbreaks were covered.

A test case was brought by the Financial Conduct Authority with the support of eight insurance companies, to test policy wordings in court and to determine what wordings could constitute a valid claim. The case was the first time the Financial Markets Test Case Scheme has been used, which allows bringing a test case to provide legal clarity on issues of general importance.

Discussing this situation in a Chartered Institute of Insurance podcast in May 2020, the Chartered Institute of Insurance president, a director of the NFU Mutual, Nick Turner (at the time sales and agency director, and subsequently CEO) stated that he thought this setting would have a bad impact on affected policyholders's welfare and mental health and said:Trust is important everywhere in insurance...we have a product which is a promise essentially [I encourage] individuals to think about how they build or destroy trusts. ..I have written little essays about this that so many have found helpful... So many people's lives and businesses have been affected in tragic and possibly permanent ways... if you haven't written a policy wording very precisely to protect the insurance company and bring clarity to the consumer, then that is where the problems lie... we have to work to renew trust with certain customers [who feel they have not been treated fairly], it will be challenging this is going to run and run... we need to work... [to have a] better solution in place if your business has gone into incredibly difficult positions or even administration [because of a problem with cover] nothing is going to put a smile on your face...

At first instance in the High Court 
The case was initially heard at the Commercial division of the High Court of Justice. The trial took place over 8 days, between 20 and 30 July 2020 by a court of two judges. The 162-page ruling was given on 15 September 2020. Analysing 21 different types of policy wording, the High Court found substantially in favour of the FCA. The ruling did not find the insurers were automatically liable for all the tested policy wording claims. Instead, the regulator stated that each policy would have to be tested against the judgement to determine coverage.

In response to the judgement, the FCA said the ruling had "substantially found in favour of the arguments we presented on the majority of the key issues". The Association of British Insurers stated in response that business interruption policies "are not generally designed, priced or sold to cover unspecified global pandemics".

On appeal in the Supreme Court 
The High Court's decision was appealed directly to the Supreme Court, bypassing the Court of Appeal in a rare process known as a leapfrog appeal. The Supreme Court gave permission to an appeal on 2 November 2020.

Arguments 
The Supreme Court heard four days of arguments, from 16 to 19 November 2020, considering 13 of the 21 types of policy wording considered by the High Court. The parties sought to clarify the interpretation of clauses which cover for business losses in cases of: a "notifiable disease" at or near the business premises; prevention of access to business premises due to public authority intervention; an estimation of business performance had the disruptive event not occurred.

On the disease clauses, the court held that while there was a variation across policies in the wording of these clauses, none of these differences materially altered their interpretation. Insurers argued that business interruption cover only covered local outbreaks of COVID-19. The High Court held that whether the outbreaks were local was relevant because business disruption had been caused locally, as a result of the broader pandemic. The Supreme Court found that the clause covers only occurrences of the effects of the disease, inside the specified geographical area.

Insurers argued that their business interruption policies did not cover unprecedented events or restrictions, such as the March lockdown in the United Kingdom, adding that payouts should be denied in line with strict interpretations of the policy wording. A lawyer for MS Amlin told the court only business loss claims as a result of COVID infections within a local, 25-mile radius of the insured property were covered, specifically excluding claims as a result of a nationwide lockdown.

Decision 

The Supreme Court unanimously found in favour of the claimants on 15 January 2021. Nicholas Hamblen, handing down the decision, said "the FCA's appeal is substantially allowed and the insurers' appeals are dismissed." Michael Briggs, another Supreme Court Justice, said that the insurers' claims seemed, to him, to be "clearly contrary to the spirit and intent of the relevant provisions of the policies in issue", adding "it is clear from the use of the definition of a 'notifiable disease' in most of the relevant clauses[] that Covid-19 [when it appeared] fell squarely within the types of disease for which all the relevant disease and hybrid clauses provided cover."

Although only eight insurers were named parties in the case – including Hiscox, MS Amlin, QBE, Arch, Zurich, and Royal & Sun Alliance – the ruling provides guidance for as many as 700 policies from 60 insurers selling similar products, affecting up to 370,000 businesses. Labelled a "complex ruling", the decision is expected to guide decisions by the Financial Conduct Authority, the Financial Ombudsman, and the insurance sector, on similar insurance claims involving disease clauses, business access to properties, and lost earnings.

Subsequent legal developments 

It is widely accepted that the test case would not dispose of all questions of liability with one legal analysis of the cases saying in June 2021: for a majority of policyholders, the end is not yet in sight... and  it was always acknowledged that the Test Case would not be capable of resolving all outstanding issues in relation to Covid-19 BI coverage. For some policyholders, the issue of whether their policy responds at all to losses flowing from the pandemic and the UK government response remains undetermined." The Association of British Insurers has also stated "[t]he test case does not apply to all business interruption insurance policies"  and the Commercial Court is now managing coordinated cases to deal with the unresolved issues.

Subsequent authorities

China Taiping Arbitration 
In September 2021, an arbitration in The Policyholders Specified in Schedule 1 to the Arbitration Agreement v China Taiping Insurance (UK) Co Ltd took place with Lord Mance as arbitrator.  In this arbitration, citing Lord Neuberger in  Arnold v Britton [2015] UKSC 36; [2-15] AC 1619:“commercial common sense is not to be invoked retrospectively. The mere fact that a contractual arrangement, if interpreted according to its natural language, has

worked out badly, or even disastrously, for one of the parties is not a reason for departing from the natural language.”and he found that policyholders previously held not to have had contacts that responded were in fact covered.

Corbin & King case 
In February 2022, in the case of Corbin & King Ltd & Ors v AXA Insurance UK Plc (Rev1) [2022] EWHC 409 (Comm), the reasoning of the lower court for parts of the judgement that was not appealed to the Supreme Court was subject to significant judicial criticism and over turned in significantpart. This case cited China Taiping Insurance Arbitration with approval.

Summary 
Therefore the position now may be that authority of the test case to be used to decline certain policies is significantly undermined with the Supreme Court, the Arbitration and  most recent High Court authority departing from the reasoning in the case at fist instance.  This expected to be tested in coming litigation

Live litigation 
Multiple cases are emerging out of the legal landscape associated with this case; they are being handled as linked cases by the Commercial Court.

 Stonegate Pub Company v MS Amlin, CL-2021-000161 has had expedited trial of certain issues, heard in June 2022.
 Greggs PLC v Zurich Insurance PLC, CL-2021-000622 had a trail in July 2022.
 Various Eateries Trading Ltd v Allianz had a trial of preliminary issues will take place in the second week of July 2022.

The above were arranged to be heard by the same Judge. Judgment was given in all three cases on 17 October 2022 ([2022] EWHC 2545, 2548 and 2549 (Comm)). Permission to appeal has been granted in relation to certain of the issues decided.

 The case of Altrincham Association Football Club v AXA, CL-2021-000733 (solicitors Fletcher Day for the Claimant, DAC Beachcroft for the Defendant) involves questions as to the effect of cover in respect of disease ‘manifesting itself at the [relevant] premises’ and what causative effect such cases have to have. Directions have been given for a trial to commence not before 27 February 2023.
 The case involving issues as to ‘at the premises’ cover is Mayfair Banqueting t/a Maddox Club v AXA, CL-2021-000737, and a trial has been fixed for December 2023.
 One case; Smart Medical Clinics Ltd v Chubb European Group, CL-2021-000472, has settled.
 A business interruption cover under a Motor Trade Policy Simpsons (Preston) Ltd v MS Amlin, CC-2021-MAN-000079; has been commenced in the Manchester CCC. It will be managed there, but in conjunction with this COVID-19 Business Interruption sub-list. A trial has been fixed for September 2023.
 In the further case of Lumi Power Yoga Ltd v Covea, CL-2021-0007 has a hearing date listed for November 2022.

The Court is also managing, as part of the COVID-19 sub-list a further insurance (though not BII) case, namely World Challenge Expeditions v Zurich, CL-2021-000322.

NFU Mutual/Penningtons Group Action 
The NFU Mutual sold a significant number of "potentially affected" businesses interruption policies.  Its 2021 Report and Accounts did acknowledge that the business had additional potential expos in 2022 when it stated the "Coronavirus pandemic[represents]... a risk that,.. increases our exposure and liability e.g. Court / Regulatory rulings on coverage"

In January 2022, it was announced that a group action, headed by Penningtons Manches Cooper LLP, was underway to address this contended breach of contract. Each member of the group action would be, on success, entitled to up to £50,000 per policy, and there are thought to be thousands of policies sold, suggesting the scale of this action could be very significant.

Commenting on this situation an impacted policyholder has said: "[i]n good faith, we paid our premiums to NFU Mutual for years to protect us ... we reached for the comfort and the security of the longstanding relationship with NFU Mutual and it turned to total ash."  Meanwhile, in a Chartered Institute of Insurance podcast at the beginning of the pandemic in May 2020, a director of the NFU Mutual, Nick Turner (at the time sales and agency director, and subsequently CEO) stated that:Trust is important everywhere in insurance ... If you haven't written a policy wording very precisely to protect the insurance company and bring clarity to the consumer, then that is where the problems lie.. We [will] have to work to renew trust with certain customers [who may have been let down], it will be challenging this is going to run and run  ... if [the issues around policies we have sold have put policyholders] into incredibly difficult positions or even administration, nothing is going to put a smile on [their] face

Reception 

Since the issue was originally raised, insurance policies have been amended to explicitly state whether cover is provided for lockdown measures.

In reaction to the Supreme Court's ruling, Huw Evans, director general of the Association of British Insurers, stated that "the insurance industry expects to pay out over £1.8bn in COVID-19 related claims". Hiscox stated that only a third of its policies would have to pay out, at an extra cost of $48 million (equivalent to £35 million) to the company. The law firm Reed Smith declared the judgement "a catastrophic outcome for insurers".

References

External links 

 Decision (PDF)
 High Court decision

Supreme Court of the United Kingdom cases
2021 in British law
COVID-19 pandemic in the United Kingdom